This list of botanical gardens in South Africa is intended to include all significant botanical gardens and arboretums in South Africa.

See also

 Protected areas of South Africa
 List of botanical gardens
 List of tourist attractions worldwide

Notes

External links 

 South African National Biodiversity Institute
 Botanic Gardens Conservation International

South Africa
 List
Botanical gardens